Shell House is the former head office of the African National Congress (ANC) in South Africa. It is a 22 floor building located at 51 Plein Street, Johannesburg.  It was the scene of the Shell House massacre on 28 March 1994, when ANC security guards opened fire on a crowd of about 20,000 supporters of the rival Inkatha Freedom Party (IFP), killing nineteen people. The ANC relocated its head office from Shell House to Luthuli House in 1997.

References 

Office buildings in Johannesburg